Halguane is a traditional Circassian tea bread. Similar breads are: bagels, simit, bubliki and baranki.

Typical ingredients are flour, eggs, water, and salt, which are combined into a firm dough.

References

Circassian cuisine
Sweet breads

he:חלגור'אן